The 2011–12 NCAA Division I women's ice hockey season began in October, 2011, and ended with the 2012 NCAA Division I Women's Ice Hockey Tournament's championship game in March, 2012.

Off season
 June 13: Mercyhurst Lakers assistant coach Paul Colontino has left the club to become head coach of the Robert Morris Colonials. He is the third head coach in Colonials history, after the resignation of Nate Handrahan, who left to assume the head coaching position at Ohio State.
 July 2011: The Lindenwood Lady Lions ice hockey program announced the 2011-12 schedule as the program's first season of NCAA competition as part of the university's transition from NAIA to NCAA. seven games against NCAA Division III; and five games against former ACHA Division I rivals Robert Morris (IL) and Grand Valley State
 Sept. 6: Robert DeGregorio, Commissioner for College Hockey America (CHA), announced that the Penn State Nittany Lions have been accepted into the CHA. The Nittany Lions will officially join the conference starting with the 2012–13 season.

Wayne State
 May 27: CHA member Wayne State University has discontinued sponsorship of the women's ice hockey program. The decision was based on the continuing reductions in the state of Michigan's appropriations to higher education. The Wayne State Warriors women's ice hockey program was the only Division I women's program in Michigan.

Transfers

Season outlook

Preseason polls
 USCHO.com Division I Women's Poll

Exhibition

CIS Exhibition

 September 17, 2011: Mercyhurst Lakers senior Bailey Bram registered a hat trick to go with her three assists, as the Lakers trounced the Wilfrid Laurier Golden Hawks women's ice hockey program by a 10-2 tally. Her sister, Shelby Bram scored one goal while freshman Kristine Grenier also registered a hat trick in the match. Kelley Steadman contributed with four assists.
 September 24: Freshman Josefine Jakobsen recorded a hat-trick as the North Dakota Fighting Sioux women's ice hockey program defeated the Manitoba Bisons women's ice hockey program by a 10-0 tally. Of note, the European freshmen that combined for 11 points in the game. Michelle Karvinen had four points, while Andrea Dalen had three points.

CWHL Exhibition

PWHL Exhibition

News and notes

September
 September 14: The Lindenwood Lady Lions ice hockey program officially submitted an application to join College Hockey America (CHA) for the 2012–13 season.
 On September 25, 2011, Hilary Knight of the Wisconsin Badgers women's ice hockey program scored her fifth career hat trick in a 13–0 defeat of the Lindenwood Lions. In addition, Brianna Decker scored her third career hat trick. The 13 goals scored by the Badgers were tied for third most in the NCAA women's ice hockey all-time list for most goals scored in a game by a team.

October
 Throughout the month of October, the WCHA women's ice hockey eight member teams will participate in causes to support Breast Cancer Awareness Month. Each team will wear a patch on their jerseys, encouraging Breast Cancer Awareness. Spectators are encouraged to wear pink clothing.
 October 7–8: Robert Morris Colonials freshman Katie Fergus accumulated three points in her NCAA debut with one goal and two assists. Against the Lindenwood Lions, she got her first-collegiate point fewer than nine minutes into the opening period. Later in the game, she scored her first goal as the Colonials were on the penalty kill. In the second game versus Lindenwood, she earned her first multi-goal game. Fergus became one of just two freshmen in Colonials history to register multi-point performances in the first two games of a season. Fergus finished the series versus Lindenwood by scoring three goals and two assists five points. In addition, she had eight shots to complement a +5 plus/minus.
 October 7–8: In a pair of victories over the Lindenwood Lions, Colgate Raiders skater Brittany Phillips accumulated a total of 10 points. In the 7–2 victory on October 7, she notched two goals, while logging an assist. One of the goals was the game-winning goal. The following day, she had seven points (two goals, five assists) in an 8–2 win. Of the four goals she scored, two were power play goals. Her seven points ranked second in program history for most points in one game. In addition, the five assists ranked second for most assists in one game. In addition, Melissa Kueber registered six points in the sweep. On October 8, she led the team with four goals scored in an 8–2 triumph over the Lions. She also notched an assist. The four tallies tied for first in program history for most scores in one game.
 October 14, 2011: Ohio State skater Laura McIntosh notched her first goal of the season to give the Buckeyes a 2–1 lead. Said goal would stand as the game-winner. In addition, she picked up an assist on a Hokey Langan goal. The assist made McIntosh Ohio State's all-time leader in career points against WCHA opponents. She surpassed Jana Harrigan's 110 league points set in 2006.
 October 21: In its WCHA home opener, the top line of the Fighting Sioux combined for thirteen points as they bested the Ohio State Buckeyes by an 11-1 margin. Monique Lamoureux-Kolls tied a North Dakota record with a 5-point game. In the contest, 13 different Sioux skaters registered at least one point. Michelle Karvinen scored a hat trick and logged one assist for four points. In addition, Josefine Jakobsen and Jocelyne Lamoureux each had 4-point games. Several program records were broken in the game including: most goals scored in a game (11), largest margin of victory (10), and largest margin of victory over a conference opponent (10).
 October 21–22: On October 21, Robert Morris Colonials freshman Rebecca Vint recorded four points, including her first game-winning goal versus RPI. She became just the second Colonial ever to tally at least four points in a game away from home. She scored twice within the game's opening eight minutes. Her performance on the 21st marked her third multi-goal effort in her first five collegiate games. The following game, she registered a goal and an assist, and extended her goal scoring streak by scoring a goal in her sixth consecutive game. It marked the first time that any Colonials skater scored in any six consecutive contests in a single season.
 October 22: Clarkson Golden Knights women's ice hockey sophomore forward Jamie Lee Rattray notched two goals for the Golden Knights in a 2-1 decision over the visiting New Hampshire Wildcats women's ice hockey program. The win helped the Golden Knights extend their unbeaten streak to six games. In addition, it was the 150th victory in the history of the program, dating back to the 2003–04 season. With the victory, the Golden Knights all-time mark is 150-111-38.
 October 25: In a 6–2 triumph over the Colgate Raiders, freshman Jillian Saulnier scored four goals in her NCAA debut. It was the first four-goal game for Cornell since Jessica Campbell scored four against Robert Morris in the second game of the 2010–11 season. The Big Red held a 64–12 advantage in shots on goal while also winning faceoffs by a margin of 53–27. The 64 shots were the most the Big Red took since a Feb. 6, 2000 contest against Union.
 October 28–29: The series versus the Mercyhurst Lakers women's ice hockey program marked the first time that the Lindenwood Lady Lions ice hockey program hosted an NCAA Division I opponent in their home arena. Mercyhurst would win the October 28 match by a 7-0 tally, in which Lakers freshman Shelby Bram would score her first career NCAA goal. The October 29 contest saw Mercyhurst emerge as the victor in a 14-0 whitewash.

November
 November 1: For the third consecutive contest, the Cornell Big Red scored at least nine goals in one game. Senior captain Chelsea Karpenko appeared in her 100th career game, as Jillian Saulnier led all Big Red players with two goals and three assists in a 9–2 triumph over the Syracuse Orange women's ice hockey program.
 November 4: Emilie Arseneault scored a short handed goal late into the second period to give the Union Dutchwomen a 2-1 conference victory over the Clarkson Golden Knights women's ice hockey program. It was the Dutchwomen's first ECAC win since the 2009–2010 season, and only their second ECAC win since 2004.
 November 18–19: In a pair of victories over the Yale Bulldogs, Hillary Pattenden won two more games to give her a career total of 87. The total is four shy of career leader, Jessie Vetter of Wisconsin. In the 9–1 victory on November 18, she stopped 14 of 15 Bulldogs shots. The following day, she stopped 21 of 23 shots in a 6–2 victory. The goal she allowed on November 18 snapped a consecutive scoreless streak of 206:36. Previous to the goal, she had not allowed a goal since the third period of a 5–4 win over the MSU Mavericks (on October 8). In addition, Lakers forward Bailey Bram increased her scoring pace by notching five goals to go with five assists in two victories over the Yale Bulldogs. In the 9–1 win on November 18, Bram registered two goals and logged two assists. The following day, she had a hand in all six goals (three goals and three assists) in the Lakers 6–2 win. Bram earned her fifth career hat trick and second of the season. In the two game set versus the Bulldogs, her plus minus rating was a +6, while her six-point game on November 19 was the second time in the season that she registered at least six points in a game. Her first was a career-high seven points in a win over the Lindenwood Lady Lions. Statistically, she logged 14 goals and 11 assists in the first 10 games she played of the season.
 Nov. 18–19: Carolyne Prevost of the Wisconsin Badgers became the 17th player in program history to record 100 career points. In a victory over RPI, she netted the first goal of the game for Wisconsin. She would also record an assist in the match. The following day, Prevost recorded six points in the finale against RPI. It was a team-high for any Wisconsin skater this season. She scored two goals, including the game winner, and helped on four other goals to establish a new career high for most points in one game.
 November 19: With a second period goal versus the Colgate Raiders, Kelly Babstock of the Quinnipiac Bobcats became the program's all-time leading scorer. In just her second season, Babstock surpassed Vicki Graham, who finished with 73 career points, after the 2006–07 season. Babstock reached the milestone in her 50th career game.
 November 25: Natalie Spooner scored four goals for the third time in her NCAA career, including a natural hat trick as the Buckeyes enjoyed a home-ice conference victory over Minnesota Duluth. She scored all four goals as the final score was 4–1 in the Buckeyes favor. It was the second time in the 2011-12 campaign that she scored four goals in a game. The natural hat trick (three consecutive goals) was scored in the second period as the Buckeyes faced a 1–0 deficit against the Bulldogs. The eventual game-winner was scored at 10:56 of the second period. The hat trick was the fifth of her collegiate career. The four goal performance moved Spooner to fourth overall on the Buckeye career points list with 129. Spooner is now four goals away from tying Jeni Creary's Ohio State record of 86 career goals.
 November 26: Quinnipiac Bobcats player Kelly Babstock led all skaters in points at the 2011 Nutmeg Classic with four (one goal, three assists). With the two assists in the championship game, Babstock earned the 39 and 40 assists of her career, surpassing Caitlin Peters as the all-time assist leader in Bobcats history. Breann Frykas scored the game-winning goal as the Bobcats bested the Robert Morris Colonials by a 3-2 tally. The victory in the Nutmeg Classic was also the 200th career victory of head coach Rick Seeley.

December
 December 10: In a 3–2 overtime victory versus Boston College, Hillary Pattenden made a career high 48 saves to earn the 91st victory of her NCAA career, tying former Wisconsin goaltender Jessie Vetter for the NCAA Division I record.
 December 10: In a WCHA contest versus Bemidji State, Hilary Knight produced four points, giving her a career total of 239. She has now surpassed Meghan Duggan's 238 career points, to become the Wisconsin Badgers all-time leading point scorer. For her efforts, Knight was recognized as the WCHA Player of the Week.
 December 14: In a 9–0 defeat of the Lindenwood Lady Lions, Mercyhurst goaltender Hillary Pattenden broke Jessie Vetter's record for career NCAA wins, by notching her 92nd career victory. Forward Bailey Bram scored two goals and added four assists while Kelley Steadman scored the game-winning goal.

January
 January 10: The Dartmouth Big Green and Providence Friars played each other in an outdoor game at Fenway Park in Boston. Providence skater Brooke Simpson scored her first career NCAA goal. With 1:14 remaining in regulation, Big Green forward Camille Dumais scored the game-winning goal on Providence netminder Genevieve Lacasse as the Big Green prevailed by a 3–2 mark.
 On Friday, January 20, 2012, Brianna Delaney scored in the third period of a 4–2 loss to CHA rival Mercyhurst. After being hooked, she scored on a wrist shot top shelf as she was falling to the ice. With the score, Delaney reached three milestones. She became just the second Robert Morris player to reach the 50 goal plateau. In addition, the score marked her 20th point of the season. It made her the first player in school history to post four 20 point seasons. Said goal also marked the 113th point of her career, the most by any Robert Morris women's hockey player in school history.
 January 27: Three Buckeyes reached milestones in a 6–2 upset of North Dakota. Laura McIntosh finished the game with three assists. Natalie Spooner totaled two goals and Hokey Langan finished with two assists. McIntosh's three helpers moved her into a tie for the all-time lead on Ohio State's all-time career points list. Her 160 career points are now tied with former Buckeye Jana Harrigan. The two goals by Spooner were both on the power-play (increasing her season total to seven). With the goals, Spooner reached the 150 career point plateau, moving her into third all-time in Ohio State history. The two assists from Langan helped her reach the 100-point milestone, only the eighth Buckeyes player to reach the mark.
 January 27–28: Wisconsin posted a two-game sweep of Bemidji State. In the first game, Madison Packer scored the game-winning goal in overtime as the Badgers prevailed by a 3–2 score. The following day, Hilary Knight notched her first goal since Dec. 10 with 7:38 left in the third period. Said goal would stand as the game winner on Fill the Bowl nights. A record crowd of 12,402 attended the Kohl Center. Alex Rigby made 28 saves to obtain her sixth shutout of the campaign. Her rival between the pipes, Bemidji State netminder Zuzana Tomcikova made 32 saves. Wisconsin is the only team to sweep the season series from the Beavers during the 2011–12 season. The previous record for most fans to watch a women's college hockey game at the Kohl Center was 10,668. That record was set at the Kohl Center on Jan. 29, 2011.

February
 February 3–4: In a sweep over CHA opponent Syracuse, Rebecca Vint led all Robert Morris Colonials skaters in points. In the first game, she scored the game-winning goal to break the Colonials’ single-season record for points in one season. In the 4–3 win versus the Orange, it was Vint's fourth game-winning goal of the season (a Colonials record). The following day, Vint tied the Colonials’ single-sea¬son mark for goals in a 5–2 triumph. In addition, she assisted on the game-winning goal to notch her 10th multi-point effort of the season.
 February 4: Jillian Dempsey was one goal short of tying the NCAA record for goals in a game, netting five against Princeton. With Harvard behind 1–0 in the second period, she netted three straight markers for a natural hat trick. Late in the second, she added her fourth of the frame. Dempsey recorded a power-play and a short-handed goal also. Her fifth goal came with 41 seconds remaining in the contest.
 February 4: The Ohio State Buckeyes defeated No. 9 Minnesota Duluth by a 4–3 mark at the AMSOIL Arena. Laura McIntosh broke the Buckeyes all-time scoring record with three points, while Natalie Spooner notched a hat trick for the Buckeyes. Prior to the game, McIntosh was tied with Jana Harrigan with 160 career points. She now is the all-time leaders with 163 points. The hat trick by Spooner was her third of the season (and sixth in her career). Spooner stands third overall in career points with 156.
 February 10: Rebecca Vint notched her fifth game-winning goal of the season, a new Robert Morris Colonials record. In addition, said goal also broke the school record for overall goals in a season. In the third period, she logged another goal to register her sixth multi-goal game of the campaign. The following day, Vint assisting on both RMU goals to break the single-season assist record. With the two assists, she also became the first Colonial to notch 40 points in a season. Her five game-winning goals leads all skaters in the CHA.
 February 17: Northeastern ended their 13-year Beanpot championship drought when Casey Pickett scored the game-winning goal in overtime past Boston University goaltender Kerrin Sperry. The Huskies prevailed by a 4-3 tally with the other Huskies goals scored by Kendall Coyne, Lucie Povova, and Sonia St. Martin. Huskies goaltender Florence Schelling made a season best 43 saves to claim her 17th win of the season.
 February 18: In a contest versus the Robert Morris Colonials, Hillary Pattenden competed in the final regular season game of her NCAA career. Heading into the game, she had 99 career regular season victories, and was aiming to be the first NCAA women's goaltender with 100 career wins. With a 4-3 Mercyhurst lead late in the third period, Colonials skater Dayna Newsom recorded a game-tying goal, as both teams skated to a 4–4 final score.
 February 18: In a 7–1 victory over MSU-Mankato, Haley Irwin netted the 200th point of her NCAA career. She became the sixth-ever Bulldog to score 200 career points as she registered a power play goal in the first period.

Regular season

Standings

Season Tournaments

Nutmeg Classic
The Nutmeg Classic will be contested on November 25 and 26.

Beanpot
The Beanpot will involve Boston College, Boston University, Northeastern and Harvard.

Scoring leaders

Awards and honors

Patty Kazmaier Memorial Award Nominees

Patty Kazmaier Memorial Award Finalists

Patty Kazmaier Memorial Award Top 3

All-conference honors

All-America honors

First team
 Florence Schelling, Goalie, Northeastern
 Megan Bozek, Defenseman, Minnesota
 Laura Fortino, Defenseman, Cornell
 Brianna Decker, Forward, Wisconsin
 Rebecca Johnston, Forward, Cornell
 Jocelyne Lamoureux, Forward, North Dakota

Second team
 Zuzana Tomčíková, Goalie, Bemidji State
 Monique Lamoureux-Kolls, Defenseman, North Dakota
 Lauriane Rougeau, Defenseman, Cornell
 Amanda Kessel, Forward, Minnesota
 Hilary Knight, Forward, Wisconsin
 Natalie Spooner, Forward, Ohio State

All Ivy League honors

First Team All-Ivy

Second Team All-Ivy

Hockey East 10th Anniversary Team
On February 29, 2012, Hockey East named its 10th Anniversary Team, along with a group of Honorable Mention players.

Honorable mention

Postseason tournaments

CHA championship game

ECAC championship game

Hockey East championship game

WCHA championship game

See also
 National Collegiate Women's Ice Hockey Championship
 2011–12 CHA women's ice hockey season
 2011–12 ECAC women's ice hockey season
 2011–12 Hockey East women's ice hockey season
 2011–12 WCHA women's ice hockey season

References

 
NCAA
NCAA
NCAA
NCAA Division I women's ice hockey seasons